Ge with macron (Г̄ г̄; italics: Г̄ г̄) is a letter of the Cyrillic script.

Ge with macron was used in the Karelian language in 1887, where it represented the voiced velar stop .

See also
Cyrillic characters in Unicode

Cyrillic letters with diacritics
Letters with macron